Chyasal Youth Club is a Nepalese professional football club from Chyasal, Lalitpur. They play in the  Martyr's Memorial A-Division League.

History
The club was founded in 1981. In 2020, the team's captain Santosh Sahukhala was the first ever player to score more than 100 goals in the Martyr's Memorial A-Division League.

Squads

Current squad

Current Technical Squad

League finishes
The season-by-season performance of CYC:

Honours

National 
 Martyr's Memorial B-Division League:
 Champions (1): 2016

References

External links
Chyasal Youth Club at GSA

Football clubs in Nepal
1981 establishments in Nepal